Jean-François Jonvelle, born on October 3, 1943, in Cavaillon was a French photographer of fashion, glamor and portraiture. Work on the release of 20 Ans magazine and then work on Dim Dam Dom Vogue, Stern, Gala, Elle. Born in 1943, he was assistant to Richard Avedon in the 1960s. During his career, he made many portraits of women, often his friends: natural young people, often naked, unconcerned. Unlike other fashion and glamor photographers, who offer a provocative woman, Jean-François Jonvelle's performance is much softer, more natural, more jovial but equally sensual. He died at the age of 58 years of terminal cancer, 15 days after it was detected on January 16, 2002, in Paris.

1943 births
2002 deaths
Fashion photographers
French photographers